The random walker algorithm is an algorithm for image segmentation.  In the first description of the algorithm, a user interactively labels a small number of pixels with known labels (called seeds), e.g., "object" and "background". The unlabeled pixels are each imagined to release a random walker, and the probability is computed that each pixel's random walker first arrives at a seed bearing each label, i.e., if a user places K seeds, each with a different label, then it is necessary to compute, for each pixel, the probability that a random walker leaving the pixel will first arrive at each seed. These probabilities may be determined analytically by solving a system of linear equations.  After computing these probabilities for each pixel, the pixel is assigned to the label for which it is most likely to send a random walker.  The image is modeled as a graph, in which each pixel corresponds to a node which is connected to neighboring pixels by edges, and the edges are weighted to reflect the similarity between the pixels.  Therefore, the random walk occurs on the weighted graph (see Doyle and Snell for an introduction to random walks on graphs).

Although the initial algorithm was formulated as an interactive method for image segmentation, it has been extended to be a fully automatic algorithm, given a data fidelity term (e.g., an intensity prior). It has also been extended to other applications.

The algorithm was initially published by Leo Grady as a conference paper and later as a journal paper.

Mathematics

Although the algorithm was described in terms of random walks, the probability that each node sends a random walker to the seeds may be calculated analytically by solving a sparse, positive-definite system of linear equations with the graph Laplacian matrix, which we may represent with the variable .  The algorithm was shown to apply to an arbitrary number of labels (objects), but the exposition here is in terms of two labels (for simplicity of exposition).

The edge weights are used to encode node similarity, which may be derived from differences in image intensity, color, texture or any other meaningful features. For example, using image intensity  at node , it is common to use the edge weighting function

The nodes, edges and weights can then be used to construct the graph Laplacian matrix.

The random walker algorithm optimizes the energy

If we let  represent the set of nodes which are seeded (i.e.) and  represent the set of unseeded nodes (i.e.,  where  is the set of all nodes), then the optimum of the energy minimization problem is given by the solution to

where the subscripts are used to indicate the portion of the graph Laplacian matrix  indexed by the respective sets.

To incorporate likelihood (unary) terms into the algorithm, it was shown in  that one may optimize the energy

Optimizing this energy leads to the system of linear equations

The set of seeded nodes, may be empty in this case (i.e.), but the presence of the positive diagonal matrices allows for a unique solution to this linear system.

For example, if the likelihood/unary terms are used to incorporate a color model of the object, then  would represent the confidence that the color at node  would belong to object (i.e., a larger value of  indicates greater confidence that  belonged to the object label) and  would represent the confidence that the color at node  belongs to the background.

Algorithm interpretations

The random walker algorithm was initially motivated by labelling a pixel as object/background based on the probability that a random walker dropped at the pixel would first reach an object (foreground) seed or a background seed.  However, there are several other interpretations of this same algorithm which have appeared in.

Circuit theory interpretations

There are well-known connections between electrical circuit theory and random walks on graphs. Consequently, the random walker algorithm has two different interpretations in terms of an electric circuit. In both cases, the graph is viewed as an electric circuit in which each edge is replaced by a passive linear resistor.

In the first interpretation, each node associated with a background seed, is tied directly to ground while each node associated with an object/foreground seed,  is attached to a unit direct current ideal voltage source tied to ground (i.e., to establish a unit potential at each ).  The steady-state electrical circuit potentials established at each node by this circuit configuration will exactly equal the random walker probabilities.  Specifically, the electrical potential,  at node  will equal the probability that a random walker dropped at node  will reach an object/foreground node before reaching a background node.

In the second interpretation, labeling a node as object or background by thresholding the random walker probability at 0.5 is equivalent to labeling a node as object or background based on the relative effective conductance between the node and the object or background seeds.  Specifically, if a node has a higher effective conductance (lower effective resistance) to the object seeds than to the background seeds, then node is labeled as object.  If a node has a higher effective conductance (lower effective resistance) to the background seeds than to the object seeds, then node is labeled as background.

Extensions

The traditional random walker algorithm described above has been extended in several ways:

 Random walks with restart
 Alpha matting
 Threshold selection
 Soft inputs
 Run on a presegmented image
 Scale space random walk
 Fast random walker using offline precomputation
 Generalized random walks allowing flexible compatibility functions 
 Power watersheds unifying graph cuts, random walker and shortest path 
 Random walker watersheds 
 Multivariate Gaussian conditional random field

Applications

Beyond image segmentation, the random walker algorithm or its extensions has been additionally applied to several problems in computer vision and graphics:

 Image Colorization
 Interactive rotoscoping
 Medical image segmentation
 Merging multiple segmentations
 Mesh segmentation
 Mesh denoising
 Segmentation editing
 Shadow elimination
 Stereo matching (i.e., one-dimensional image registration)
 Image fusion

References

External links
Matlab code implementing the original random walker algorithm
Matlab code implementing the random walker algorithm with precomputation
Python implementation of the original random walker algorithm  in the image processing toolbox scikit-image

Image segmentation